Doctor Dracula is a 1978 horror film directed by Al Adamson, featuring John Carradine.

Cast
 John Carradine – Hadley Radcliff 
 Don Barry – Elliot
 Larry Hankin – Wainwright 
 Geoffrey Land – Gregorio 
 Susan McIver – Stephanie
 Regina Carrol – Valerie 
 Jane Brunel-Cohen  – Trilby

External links

References

1978 horror films
Dracula films
Films directed by Al Adamson
1978 films
1970s English-language films